The 2016 Ohio Bobcats football team represented Ohio University in the 2016 NCAA Division I FBS football season. They were led by 12th-year head coach Frank Solich and played their home games at Peden Stadium. They were members of the East Division of the Mid-American Conference. They finished the season 8–6, 6–2 in MAC play to finish in a two-way tie for the East Division title. They represented the East Division in the MAC Championship Game where they lost to Western Michigan. They were invited to the Dollar General Bowl where they lost to Troy.

Schedule

Schedule Source:
,

Game summaries

Texas State

at Kansas

at Tennessee

Gardner–Webb

at Miami (OH)

Bowling Green

Eastern Michigan

at Kent State

at Toledo

Buffalo

at Central Michigan

Akron

vs. Western Michigan–MAC Championship Game

vs. Troy–Dollar General Bowl

References

Ohio
Ohio Bobcats football seasons
Ohio Bobcats football